Biologically Inspired Tactical Security Infrastructure (BITSI) is a system to detect and repair computer damage in the battlespace.

See also
Information warfare

References

 

Information operations and warfare
Post–Cold War military equipment of the United States